Hurts are an English musical duo from Manchester.

Hurts  may also refer to:

 "Hurts" (song), by Emeli Sandé, 2016
 "Hurts", a song by Lany from LANY, 2017
 "Hurts", a song by Mika from No Place in Heaven, 2016
 "Hurts", a song by Wafia featuring Louis the Child and Whethan, 2019
 Jalen Hurts (born 1998), American football quarterback

See also
 
 
 Hertz (disambiguation)
 Herz (disambiguation)
 Hurt (disambiguation)
 Hurtz, a surname